The Algerian football league system is a series of interconnected leagues for football clubs in Algeria.

Structure 
There is one professional division in the country (Ligue 1), and another one is semi-professional (Ligue 2). The other divisions are amateur divisions.

Men

National leagues

Regional leagues

Wilaya (Departmental) leagues

West region

Centre region

East region

South-West region

South-East region

Women

National leagues

External links 
  Federation of Algerian Football official website
  National Football League official website
  Inter-Regions Football League official website

Alg